The lichen moray (Gymnothorax hubbsi) is a moray eel found in the western Atlantic Ocean, around eastern Florida, the Bahamas, and Cuba. It was first named by Böhlke and Böhlke in 1977.

References

hubbsi
Fish described in 1977